The National Ethnic Affairs Commission is a cabinet-level executive department of the State Council of the People's Republic of China under the formal leadership of the United Front Work Department that is responsible for relations between the Chinese government and ethnic minorities in China. It supervises the implementation - and monitors the performance - of national and regional systems to manage ethnic minorities.

History
In 2018, the NEAC was officially placed under the direct leadership of the United Front Work Department of the Central Committee of the Chinese Communist Party.

In 2020, a Han Chinese Chen Xiaojiang was named director of the Commission, the first Han Chinese to lead the body since 1954. In 2022, Pan Yue became the director.

List of Ministers

Subsidiary institutions 
 Publishing House of Minority Nationalities

See also 

 Zhonghua minzu
 List of ethnic groups in China
Zhao Yannian, Vice Minister (1986–2003)

Related PRC authorities 
 National People's Congress Ethnic Affairs Committee
 State Administration for Religious Affairs

Similar government agencies 
 Mongolian and Tibetan Affairs Commission (Republic of China)
 Lifan Yuan (Qing dynasty)
 Bureau of Buddhist and Tibetan Affairs (Yuan dynasty)

References

External links 
 

Government agencies of China
State Council of the People's Republic of China
1949 establishments in China
Government agencies established in 1949
Ethnicity in politics
Organizations associated with the Chinese Communist Party
China
Ethnic groups in China
United front (China)